Dog is the third studio album by Sow released in 2010. At this time Sow comprises Anna Wildsmith with "Boys", where the Boys are Rob Henry, Raymond Watts and Mike Watts.

Releases
I, Absentee #IA025 – CD/Digital, 2010

Track listing
"Slap" – 3:10
"Crybaby" – 3:30
"Blue Sheets" – 3:20
"The Kidnapping Of Anna Wildsmith" – 4:25
"Pornostar" – 4:04
"Lip" – 3:14
"More Candy" – 2:22
"My House" – 7:15
"Kali" – 7:17
"Like It Should Be" – 2:53

Personnel
 Rob Henry – production, writing and instrumentals (tracks: 1, 3, 4, 5, 7)
 Raymond Watts – production, writing and instrumentals (tracks: 2, 6, 8, 10), musical arrangement (track 9)
 Mike Watts – writing and instrumentals (track 9)
 Steve White – guitar (track 9)
 Arianne Schreiber – backing vocals (track 9)
 Anna Wildsmith – production, writing, lyrics, vocal performance

Design
 Sophie Lacoste – photography
 Simon Wildsmith – artwork and design

Sow (band) albums
2010 albums